Bea Chester (born c.1921) was a utility infielder who played in the All-American Girls Professional Baseball League. She batted and threw right-handed.

A native of Brooklyn, New York, Bea Chester was one of the original South Bend Blue Sox founding members of the All-American Girls Professional Baseball League in its 1943 inaugural season. She served primarily as a backup at third base for Lois Florreich, hitting a .190 batting average in 18 games.

She opened 1944 with the Rockford Peaches, being used mostly as a pinch hitter and defensive replacement. She batted .214 that year, while collecting a .313 on-base percentage in 11 games.

Chester could not be reached after leaving the league in 1944. She was a daughter of Hilda Chester, a mid-20th century superfan of the Brooklyn Dodgers.

Career statistics
Batting 

Fielding

Sources

All-American Girls Professional Baseball League players
South Bend Blue Sox players
Rockford Peaches players
Sportspeople from Brooklyn
Baseball players from New York City
Year of birth uncertain
Possibly living people